MTV ao Vivo is the third live album by Brazilian rock band Titãs. It was recorded during a show at Fortaleza de São José da Ponta Grossa, in Florianópolis, Santa Catarina on 12 and 13 August from that year and released as CD and DVD. The album was edited and mixed Jack Endino (who also produced it, marking the last time he produced an album for the band) at Mega studios in Rio de Janeiro from August to September 2005 and mastered at Classic Master studios, in São Paulo, in September of the same year.

The album features three new songs: "O Inferno São os Outros", ""Anjo Exterminador" and "Vossa Excelência", besides a cover of "O Portão", originally by Roberto Carlos (CD-exclusive).

Track listing

Singles

"O Inferno São os Outros" 

"O Inferno São os Outros" was released as the twentieth single by Titãs in 2006. The title of the song translates as "Hell is other people", a quotation from No Exit by Jean-Paul Sartre.

Track listing

Personnel 
Adapted from the album booklet:

Titãs 
 Paulo Miklos - lead vocals on tracks 3, 7, 10, 12, 13, 20; co-lead vocals on 4; backing vocals on tracks 1, 2, 5, 6, 8, 9, 11, 15-19; guitar on tracks 3, 10-14, 16, 18, 19; harmonica on tracks 1 and 4
 Branco Mello - lead vocals on tracks 1, 5, 11, 14, 15, 17, 19; backing vocals on tracks 2-4, 6-10, 13, 16, 20; bass on tracks 10-14, 16, 18
 Sérgio Britto - lead vocals on tracks 2, 6, 8, 9, 16, 18; co-lead vocals on 4; backing vocals on tracks 1, 3, 5, 7, 10-15, 17, 19, 20; keyboard on tracks 6, 7, 11-13, 17-20
 Tony Bellotto - guitar on all tracks; solos on tracks 2, 13, 20
 Charles Gavin - drums on all tracks

Session musicians 
 Emerson Villani: backing vocals on track 1; guitar on tracks 1-9, 15, 17, 19, 20; solo on track 5
 Lee Marcucci - bass on tracks 1-9, 15, 17, 19, 20

Technical personnel 
 Jack Endino - production, recording engineering, edition and mixing
 Paulo Peres, Alexandre Tubita and Lincoln Mendes - auxiliary recording technicians
 Fernando Fortes and Cláudio Fujimori - recording assistants
 Marco Hoffer - studio assistant and Pro Tools editing
 Guthemberg Pereira, Tude and Arthur - editing and mixing assistants
 Carlos Freitas - mastering
 Nelson Damascena - executive production
 Bruno Batista - art directing
 Paula Melo - project coordination
 Deyse Simões - manager
 Toni Vanzolini, Gualter Pupo and Christiano Calvet - cover and graphical project
 Marcelo Rossi - cover and booklet photographs
 Daniela Conolly - art supervising
 Sandro Mesquita - graphical coordination

Pre-production 
Carried out at Nimbus Studios, in São Paulo, from June to August 2005; and on Jam House Studios, in Rio de Janeiro, in July and August 2005
 Canrobert Marques - monitor technician
 Sergio Trentini and Vicente Cernauskas - roadies
 San Issobe, ângelo Cazarin, Julio Cazarin and Felipe Barros - recording technicians at Nimbus Studios
 Xuxa, Rodrigo Issobe, Rui Goreba and Lirinha - assistants at Nimbus Studios
 Augusto César - assistant at Jam House Studios

Show productions 
 Frederico Fonseca and Lica Paludo - show production
 Liliam Teixeira, Renatos Santos and Francisco Oliveira - production assistants
 Toni Vanzolini e Gualter Pupo - scenography
 Denis Netto - scenography assistant
 Celso Luiz dos Santos - scenotechnician
 Marcos Olívio - lighting
 Spock - lighting assistant
 Claudia Kopke - costume designer
 Anísio Lima - power amp technician
 Canrobert Marques - monitor technician
 Sombra Jones, Sergio Trentini and Vicente Cernauskas - roadies
 Lauro Silva - security guard
 Wagner Credendio and Juarez Modesto - drivers
 Golden Air Aerotaxi - helicopter rent

References

Titãs live albums
2005 live albums
Sony Music Brazil live albums
Albums produced by Jack Endino